Khomruduiyeh or Khamruduiyeh or Khamardooeyeh may refer to:
Khomruduiyeh, Rafsanjan
Khomruduiyeh, Zarand

See also
Khomrutuiyeh